The Commonwealth Grants Commission is an Australian independent statutory body that advises the Australian Government on financial assistance to the states and territories of Australia under section 96 of the Australian Constitution. The Commission was established in July 1933 by the Lyons Government during the Great Depression to provide impartial advice on the distribution of federal government grants to the states. The Commission operates under the Commonwealth Grants Commission Act 1973, and is responsible for measuring the relative fiscal capacity of each state and territory.

The Commission recommends how the revenues raised from the goods and services tax (GST) should be distributed to each state and territory to achieve horizontal fiscal equalisation (HFE), a central feature of the Australian federation.

References to Commission 
The Commission responds to a reference from the Australian Treasurer, which are generally requests for calculating appropriate ratios of per capita grants for distributing general revenue assistance from the Australian government to the states and territories. The details of these references are usually negotiated between the Commonwealth, state and territory treasury departments before being formally issued by the Treasurer.

The Commission reports to the Australian government and then provides copies to the states and territories. The recommendations are then considered at the annual meetings of the Treasurers of the Commonwealth, states and territories.

On 31 March 2016, the Commission received a reference to inquire into and report by 7 April 2016 on the per capita relativities to be used to distribute GST revenue among the states and the territories in 2016-17.

Every five years, the Commission undertakes a review of the methodology underlying the Commission’s advice to the government on the relative fiscal capacity of each state and territory. The last reference was given on 29 November 2016 and the review was completed in March 2020. The purpose of reviews is to determine the most appropriate methods and data for measuring the relative fiscal capacity of states and territories.

See also
 Fiscal imbalance in Australia
 Council of Australian Governments

General:
 Equalization payments
 Fiscal imbalance
 transfer payment ally

Federal budget:
 Australian federal budget

References

External links
Official site

Commonwealth Government agencies of Australia
Government agencies established in 1933
Government finances in Australia